Íris Mendes (born June 3, 1996) is a Portuguese female acrobatic gymnast. With partners Barbara da Silva Sequeira and Jessoca Correia, Mendes achieved 8th in the 2014 Acrobatic Gymnastics World Championships.

References

1996 births
Living people
Portuguese acrobatic gymnasts
Female acrobatic gymnasts